Robert Furber (1674–1756) was a British horticulturist and author, best known for writing the first seed catalogue produced in England.

Furber was a member of the "English Society of Gardners", a group formed in 1724 to protect the reputations of plant growers by mutually agreeing to names for newly discovered plants. Furber contributed to the group's work, including collaborating on a book documenting the plants discovered and named by the group.

He had a nursery in Kensington in London (near modern Hyde Park Gate/Gloucester Road) from around 1700 until his death. It was taken over by his colleague John Williamson, then others and survived until the 1840s.

Furber's most notable work was Twelve Months of Flowers, published in 1730. The book was written as a catalog of plants and seeds, and featured twelve detailed engravings of seasonal plants in bloom. Henry Fletcher produced each of the twelve hand-colored engravings from paintings by Pieter Casteels. Each plant was numbered, with a list of the corresponding species names provided. More than 400 different species of plant were featured. The plates were originally sold on a subscription basis for £1 5s in uncolored form, or £2 12s 6d for a colored version. The book was reprinted in 1982.

In 1732, Furber produced a follow-up work entitled Twelve Months of Fruit. Like his previous collection of flowers, Twelve Months of Fruit featured twelve full-color plates with 364 different fruit. Each plate focused on one month, and showed the varieties of fruit that would ripen during that month.

Other works by Furber include a 1732 book entitled The Flower Garden Displayed, a general-purpose book written for a wider audience.

He also had a position as an overseer of the poor in Kensington (St Mary Abbots parish, 1718) and was a churchwarden between 1725–6 and 1736–7.

Personal life
He married Mary Everton in about 1706 and they had one son, William. He was buried at St Mary Abbots on 1 September 1756.

References

English horticulturists
1674 births
1756 deaths